The Surrey South Eastern Combination is one of the three intermediate association football leagues based in the English county of Surrey (the others are the Surrey Elite Intermediate League and the Surrey County Intermediate League (Western)). It currently comprises clubs from the east of Surrey and parts of Greater London. It was founded in 1991.  

The league's top division is situated at the 12th level of the English football league system, and acts as a feeder to the Surrey Elite Intermediate League. Clubs may be promoted into the league from the Kingston & District League and the Wimbledon & District League.

Currently, the league has nine divisions – three Intermediate Divisions and six Junior Divisions.

2022–23 members

Intermediate Division One
Banstead Rovers
Chelsea Rovers
Earlsfield SSEC
Earlsfield United
Frenches Athletic
Goldfingers
NPL
Richmond & Kew
Selhurst
Sporting 50
Tooting Bec Reserves
Westminster Casuals

Intermediate Division Two
AFC Ewell
Ashtead
Barnes FC
Chiswick
Fulham Athletic
Junction Elite
Kew Park Rangers
Old Boys Clapham
Old Plymouthians
Old Rutlishians
South Croydon
Wanderers

Junior Division One
Battersea Ironsides Reserves
Croygas
Doverhouse Lions
Lambeth Spartans
Pavletico Rovers
RC Old Boys
Surrey Casuals
Thames United
Wallington Victory
West Fulham
Woodmansterne Hyde
Worcester Park Development

Junior Division Two
AFC Walcountians Reserves
Epsom Casuals
Frenches Athletic Reserves
Junction Elite Reserves
Motspur Park
NPL Reserves
Panthers
Sporting 50 Reserves
Tooting Bec 'A'
Wandgas Vets
Warlingham

Junior Division Three
Ashtead Athletic
Colliers Wood Town
Croydon Town
Junction Elite U23
MC United
NPL 'A'
Old Boys Clapham Reserves
Old Rutlishians Reserves
Purley Old Boys
Sutton High
Wandgas Worcester Park Vets
Westside 'A'

Junior Division Four
AFC Malden
AFC North Leatherhead
Cheam Village Warriors
Mitcham Park
Old Rutlishians 'A'
Real Holmesdale
Southern Athletic
Sutton High Reserves
Tolworth United
Tooting Bec 'B'
Wanderers Reserves
Warlingham Reserves

Junior Division Five
Dorking Cobblers
Frenches Athletic 'A'
Jak's
London Olympia
Mitcham Park Reserves
NPL 'B'
Old Rutlishians 'B'
Sutton High 'A'
Waddon Wanderers
Warlingham 'A'
Woodmansterne Hyde U23

Previous champions

External links
Football Mitoo

 
Football in Surrey
Football leagues in England
Sports leagues established in 1991
1991 establishments in England